Stephen Christopher Stanko (born January 13, 1968,Guantánamo Bay Naval Base, Cuba) is an American convicted murderer, who killed two people and raped a teenage girl in Murrells Inlet, South Carolina in 2005.

Prior to the murders
Before his murder conviction, Stanko had been incarcerated for assault and kidnapping in 1996. Stanko was released from prison in 2004 after serving 8 years of the 10-year sentence. While in prison, he co-authored Living in Prison: A History of the Correctional System With an Insider's View. (The book was written during his first incarceration.)

Stanko has been described as "a highly intelligent, polished ex-convict who didn't mind talking about his life in prison or the book he'd written about it."

After his release in 2004, Stanko moved to Myrtle Beach, renting a room in the home of a Socastee widow for almost a year. His parole officer visited the home to ensure his landlady was aware of his background, which he had disclosed when applying for the rental. His relationship with his landlady was uneventful other than his occasionally being late with the rent. He often complained about his difficulty getting a job because of his background, although he had one or two brief employments. He abruptly moved out after almost a year, moving to a friend's home in exchange for keeping an eye on her elderly mother.

The murders
About one year after being released from prison, Stanko began doing library research, supposedly for a second book.  While doing this research, he befriended librarian Laura Ling and eventually moved in with her as her boyfriend. He also had developed a seemingly friendly relationship with a library patron, Henry Turner. 

In April 2005, Stanko strangled Laura Ling (43) shot Henry Lee Turner (74) dead and sexually assaulted and slit the throat of Ling's teenage daughter, who survived and made the 911 call for help. He was convicted of these charges after trials in which an insanity defense was used. The Ling trial was held in 2006, and the Turner trial in 2009. Following the convictions, he was sentenced to death in both cases.

Articles on Jeffrey Dahmer, Green River killer Gary Ridgway, and other serial killers were found in Stanko's home.  According to a police spokesperson: "He either was just interested in serial killers, or he was becoming a serial killer."

After a nationwide manhunt, based on tips received after the posting of a $10,000 reward for information leading to his capture, Stanko was arrested without incident by the U.S. Marshals Service in Augusta, Georgia on April 12, 2005.

Awaiting execution
Stephen Stanko is currently on death row at Broad River Correctional Institution in Columbia, South Carolina, and under South Carolina's Act 43 of 2021, would be executed by electric chair or firing squad.  He is the first person to be sentenced to death in Georgetown County in nearly 11 years.

The first phase of Stanko's appeals process began on September 23, 2007, when he appeared before the South Carolina Supreme Court in a bid to overturn his death penalty conviction in the Laura Ling case.  His attorney said that errors in the original trial resulted in his conviction in that the trial judge did not allow the defense to ask potential jurors how they felt about the insanity defense and did not allow the defense to present Stanko's age/mentality as aggravating or mitigating factors. However, the conviction and sentence were affirmed.

In February 2013, Stanko lost his appeal in the Henry Turner murder case; the South Carolina Supreme Court affirmed Stanko's conviction and sentence.

In 2015, there was a post-conviction relief (PCR) hearing. The court heard testimony from Bill Diggs, Stanko's trial attorney, that Stanko suffered from a brain defect.  On May 24, 2016, the court reaffirmed his conviction.

See also
 List of death row inmates in the United States

References

External links
Stephen Stanko at mylifeofcrime.wordpress.com

1968 births
American people convicted of murder
Living people
American prisoners sentenced to death
Prisoners sentenced to death by South Carolina
People convicted of murder by South Carolina
American male writers
American rapists
People from Guantánamo